The 19th Filipino Academy of Movie Arts and Sciences Awards Night was held in 1971 for the Outstanding Achievements for the year 1970. 

Mga Anghel na Walang Langit of FPJ Productions a movie about the life of street children won the most awards with 6 wins including the FAMAS Award for Best Picture and Best Story for Ronwaldo Reyes. This is the first movie where FPJ used the name Ronwaldo Reyes. Except from close associates in the production, no one knew who Ronwaldo Reyes was until the FAMAS awarding when Reyes was declared as the winner for best story. FPJ appeared and revealed himself as the man behind the man. Since then, he had been using the name in his writing and directorial credit. On the other hand, Eddie Garcia was nominated in 3 different categories; Best Director for Crisis, best actor for Tubog sa Ginto (winner) and Best Supporting Actor for Pipo.

Awards

Major Awards
Winners are listed first and highlighted with boldface.

Special Awardee

Dr. Ciriaco Santiago Memorial Award 
Eddie Romero

References

External links
FAMAS Awards 

FAMAS Award
FAMAS
FAMAS